Acanthococcus may refer to:
 Acanthococcus (bug), a genus of true bugs in the family Eriococcidae
 Acanthococcus (alga), a genus of red algae in the family Cystocloniaceae